The Eocrinidae are a family of early echinoderms that contain the genus Gogia.

References

Goggida
Blastozoa
Prehistoric echinoderm families
Cambrian first appearances
Cambrian extinctions